Colm J. Meaney (born 30 May 1953) is an Irish actor known for playing Miles O'Brien in Star Trek: The Next Generation (1987–1994) and Star Trek: Deep Space Nine (1993–1999). He has guest-starred on many TV shows including Law & Order and The Simpsons, and starred as Thomas C. Durant on Hell on Wheels (2011–2016).

He has a career in films, appearing in  Layer Cake, The Damned United, all three film adaptations of Roddy Doyle's The Barrytown Trilogy, and in Get Him to the Greek. He portrayed a principal character in the film The Englishman who Went up a Hill but Came down a Mountain. In 2017, Meaney won the Best Actor IFTA for his portrayal of Irish politician Martin McGuinness in the film The Journey. In 2020, he was listed at number 24 on The Irish Times list of Ireland's greatest film actors.

Early life
Meaney was born in Finglas, Dublin. He began studying acting at age 14, and he entered the Abbey Theatre School of Acting after secondary school. He became a member of the Irish National Theatre and worked for the next eight years in England, touring with several theatre companies, including the 7:84 theatre group founded by John McGrath.

Career

Meaney's first television appearance was in Z-Cars on BBC One, in 1978. He guest-starred on shows such as Remington Steele and Moonlighting before embarking on a successful film career; he received a Golden Globe nomination for Best Actor for his role in The Snapper.

Meaney first appeared on Star Trek: The Next Generation in its 1987 pilot episode, "Encounter at Farpoint", as an unnamed helm officer. His character became a frequently recurring one, and was given the name of Miles O'Brien as he became more prominent in the crew as Transporter Chief. In 1993, Meaney left The Next Generation for a main role in its spin-off Star Trek: Deep Space Nine and remained on that show until its final episode, in 1999. With 225 total appearances on Star Trek, he is second to Michael Dorn with most appearances on the franchise.

Meaney played Colum O'Hara in the 1994 miniseries Scarlett, the sequel to Gone With the Wind. He has played a minor recurring role as Cowen, leader of the Genii on the series Stargate Atlantis, guest-starred on Law & Order, Law & Order: Criminal Intent and appeared as Bob O'Donnell on the ABC show Men in Trees. Meaney appeared in the film Die Hard 2, playing the pilot for the plane Windsor 114 that was later crashed by Colonel Stuart.

He was the only actor to appear in all three film adaptations of Roddy Doyle's The Barrytown Trilogy, wherein he played the father of the Rabbitte family. His stage appearances include the Old Vic production of Eugene O'Neill's A Moon for the Misbegotten. Meaney starred in British comedy film Three and Out released in the UK on 25 April 2008. In July of the same year An Post (the Irish Post Office) issued a postage stamp showing Meaney as Joe Mullen in the film Kings.

In 2009, Meaney co-starred with Gerard Butler and Jamie Foxx in Law Abiding Citizen, playing Detective Dunnigan. In March 2009, Meaney voiced an Irish bartender on the St. Patrick's Day episode of The Simpsons, "In the Name of the Grandfather". In the same month the film The Damned United was released, a mostly fictional retelling of the 44-day period in which Brian Clough was manager of Leeds United F.C. Meaney played the former Leeds manager Don Revie. He co-starred in Soldiers of Fortune. In 2013, Meaney co-starred in Alan Partridge: Alpha Papa. In 2014, he appeared as The Horse in the BBC's three-part crime story The Driver. For five seasons he portrayed railroad magnate Thomas C. Durant on AMC's drama series Hell on Wheels.

Personal life
Meaney married Irish actress Bairbre Dowling in 1977. Their daughter Brenda was born in 1984. The couple divorced in 1994. He married French costume designer Ines Glorian in March 2007. Their daughter was born in 2005. They live in the Majorcan town of Sóller.

Meaney is a supporter of Sinn Féin.

Filmography

Film

Television

References

External links

 

1953 births
People from Glasnevin
Ballygall
20th-century Irish male actors
21st-century Irish male actors
Irish expatriates in the United States
Irish male film actors
Irish male stage actors
Irish male television actors
Abbey Theatre
Living people
People educated at O'Connell School